First United Methodist Church may refer to:

Alabama
 First United Methodist Church (Birmingham, Alabama)
 Eufaula First United Methodist Church
 First United Methodist Church (Jasper, Alabama)
 First United Methodist Church (Wetumpka, Alabama)

Arkansas
 First United Methodist Church (Conway, Arkansas)
 First United Methodist Church (DeWitt, Arkansas)
 First United Methodist Church (Fordyce, Arkansas)
 First United Methodist Church (Forrest City, Arkansas)
 First United Methodist Church (Hamburg, Arkansas)
 First United Methodist Church (Little Rock, Arkansas)
 First United Methodist Church (Lockesburg, Arkansas)
 First United Methodist Church (Searcy, Arkansas)

Florida
 First United Methodist Church (Jasper, Florida)
 First United Methodist Church (Kissimmee, Florida)
 First United Methodist Church of Orlando
 First United Methodist Church of St. Petersburg, Florida
 First Church of Coral Springs, Florida

Georgia
 Atlanta First United Methodist Church
 First United Methodist Church (Douglas, Georgia)

Idaho
 First United Methodist Church (Coeur d'Alene, Idaho)
 Cathedral of the Rockies First United Methodist Church, Boise

Illinois
 First United Methodist Church of Chicago

Iowa
 First United Methodist Church (Chariton, Iowa)
 First United Methodist Church (Des Moines, Iowa)

Kentucky
 First United Methodist Church (Catlettsburg, Kentucky)
 First United Methodist Church (Louisa, Kentucky)
 First United Methodist Church (Paintsville, Kentucky)
 First United Methodist Church (Prestonburg, Kentucky)

Louisiana
 First United Methodist Church (Columbia, Louisiana)
 First United Methodist Church (DeRidder, Louisiana)
 First United Methodist Church (Lafayette, Louisiana)
 First United Methodist Church (Leesville, Louisiana)
 First United Methodist Church (New Iberia, Louisiana)
 First United Methodist Church (Shreveport, Louisiana)
 First United Methodist Church (West Monroe, Louisiana)

Maryland
 First United Methodist Church (Laurel, Maryland)

Michigan
 First United Methodist Church (Farmington, Michigan)
 First United Methodist Church (Highland Park, Michigan)

Nebraska
 First United Methodist Church (Nebraska City, Nebraska)

Nevada
 First United Methodist Church (Reno, Nevada)

New York
 First United Methodist Church (Gloversville, New York)
 First United Methodist Church (Ilion, New York)
 First United Methodist Church (Mount Vernon, New York)
 Asbury First United Methodist Church, Rochester

North Carolina
 First United Methodist Church (Lincolnton, North Carolina)

Ohio
 First United Methodist Church (Elyria, Ohio)
 Franklin First United Methodist Church
 First United Methodist Church (London, Ohio)
 First United Methodist Church (Salem, Ohio)
 First United Methodist Church (Woodsfield, Ohio)

Oklahoma
 First United Methodist Church of Drumright
 First United Methodist Church (Fairview, Oklahoma), a National Register of Historic Places listing in Major County, Oklahoma
 First United Methodist Church (Walters, Oklahoma)

Oregon
 Salem First United Methodist Church

South Dakota
 First United Methodist Church (Aberdeen, South Dakota)

Tennessee
 First United Methodist Church of Columbia
 First United Methodist Church (Humboldt, Tennessee)

Texas
 First United Methodist Church (Crockett, Texas), a National Register of Historic Places listing in Houston County, Texas
 First United Methodist Church (Dallas, Texas)
 First United Methodist Church (Paris, Texas)
 First United Methodist Church (San Marcos, Texas)
 First United Methodist Church (Waco, Texas)

Washington
 First United Methodist Church (Seattle)

Wyoming
 First United Methodist Church (Cheyenne, Wyoming)

See also

 
 
 The Methodist Church (disambiguation)
 First Methodist Church (disambiguation)
 First United Church (disambiguation)
 United Methodist Church (disambiguation)
 List of Methodist churches

United Methodist Church